A general election was held in the U.S. state of Maryland on November 8, 2022. All of Maryland's executive officers were up for election as well as all of Maryland's eight seats in the United States House of Representatives, one of its U.S. senators, and the state legislature. Primaries were held on July 19, 2022. Polls were open from 7 AM to 8 PM EST.

The Democratic Party swept every statewide election, flipping the governorship and lieutenant governorship from the Republican Party, while maintaining supermajorities in the state's congressional delegation and the state legislature. As such, the party won full control of Maryland state government for the first time since 2014.

United States Senate

Incumbent Democratic U.S. Senator Chris Van Hollen was first elected in 2016 with 60.9% of the vote, and was running for a second term. Ten Republican candidates filed to run in the election.

Van Hollen won reelection with 65.4% of the votes.

United States House of Representatives

Maryland has eight seats to the United States House of Representatives which are currently held by seven Democrats and one Republican.

Governor

Incumbent Republican governor Larry Hogan is term-limited by the Maryland Constitution and cannot run for re-election. He was re-elected in 2018 with 55.4% of the vote.

Among the Republican candidates are former state commerce secretary Kelly Schulz and state delegate Dan Cox. Democratic candidates include Comptroller Peter Franchot, author Wes Moore, and former Democratic National Committee chairman Tom Perez.

Comptroller

Incumbent Comptroller Peter Franchot was eligible to run for a fifth term, but instead ran for Governor of Maryland. Democratic candidates Bowie mayor Tim Adams and state delegate Brooke Lierman, and Republican Harford County executive Barry Glassman, filed to run in the primary election.

Attorney General

Incumbent attorney general Brian Frosh was eligible to run for a third term, but announced on October 21, 2021, that he would be retiring at the end of his term in early 2023. Democratic candidates included U.S. Representative and former lieutenant governor Anthony Brown and retired judge and former First Lady of Maryland Katie O'Malley. Republican candidates included former Montgomery County Board of Elections chairman Jim Shalleck and former Anne Arundel County councilmember and 2004 Constitution Party candidate for president Michael Peroutka.

State legislature 

All 47 seats in the Maryland Senate and 141 seats in the Maryland House of Delegates are up for election in 2022. Democrats currently hold a veto-proof majority in both chambers.

State Senate

House of Delegates

Local elections 

Elections for county executives in eight of Maryland's 23 counties and numerous local elections are also scheduled to take place in 2022. Some notable ones include:
 Businessman David Blair is challenging incumbent Montgomery County executive Marc Elrich, setting up a rematch between the two candidates after Elrich defeated Blair by 77 votes in 2018.
 County councilmember Jessica Haire is running against former state delegate Herb McMillan for the Republican nomination in the Anne Arundel County executive race.
 Attorney Robbie Leonard is challenging Baltimore County State's Attorney Scott Shellenberger.
 Attorneys Ivan Bates and Thiru Vignarajah are challenging Baltimore City State's Attorney Marilyn Mosby
 Former assistant sheriff Sam Cogen is challenging Baltimore City Sheriff John W. Anderson.

Ballot propositions

Polling 
On Question 4

On whether recreational marijuana should be legal

See also 
 Political party strength in Maryland
 Elections in Maryland

Notes

Partisan clients

References

External links
Candidates at Vote Smart 
Candidates at Ballotpedia

 
Maryland